Nationality words link to articles with information on the nation's poetry or literature (for instance, Irish or France).

Events

1136:
Jongleur Palla at the Toledo court of Alfonso VII of León

Works published

1130:
 Earliest likely date for works of Gwalchmai ap Meilyr

1133:
 Man Jiang Hong written by Yue Fei

1137:
Li coronemenz Looïs possibly written

Births
Death years link to the corresponding "[year] in poetry" article. There are conflicting or unreliable sources for the birth years of many people born in this period; where sources conflict, the poet is listed again and the conflict is noted:

1130:
 Guilhem de Berguedan (died 1196), troubadour
 Owain Cyfeiliog (died 1197), one of the Welsh Poets of the Princes
 Akka Mahadevi (died 1160), writer of Vachana sahitya didactic poetry
 Tibors de Sarenom (died 1198), trobairitz
 Eugenius of Palermo (died 1202), amiratus (admiral), translator, and poet
 Zhu Xi (died 1200), Confucian scholar, writer, and poet

1134:
 Basava (died 1196), writing in Kannada

1135:
 Zhu Shuzhen (died 1180), Chinese poet of the Song dynasty

1138:
 Giraut de Bornelh (died 1215), French troubadour whose his skill earned him the nickname of "Master of the Troubadours"

1139:
 Jakuren (died 1202), Japanese Buddhist priest and poet

Deaths
Birth years link to the corresponding "[year] in poetry" article:

1130:
 Baldric of Dol (born 1050), abbot who wrote epitaphs, riddles, epistolary, and long form poems

1131:
 December 4: Omar Khayyám (born 1048), Persian polymath, mathematician, philosopher, astronomer and poet
 Sanai (born 1080), Persian (approx.)

1137:
 Meilyr Brydydd, one of the Welsh Poets of the Princes

1138:
Ibn Khafajah, died this year or 1139 (born 1058) Arabic-language poet in Al-Andalus (Spain)

See also

 Poetry
 12th century in poetry
 12th century in literature
 List of years in poetry

Other events:
 Other events of the 12th century
 Other events of the 13th century

12th century:
 12th century in poetry
 12th century in literature

Notes

12th-century poetry
Poetry